Makhmur may refer to:

Makhmur, Iran
Makhmur, Iraq